Willoughby's Magic Hat is a 1943 Phantasies animated short subject directed by Bob Wickersham, produced by Screen Gems, and released to theatres by Columbia Pictures on April 20, 1943.

The short features the character of a diminutive, weak man named Willoughby Wren, who finds he is granted super-strength by wearing a cap woven from the hair of Samson. He then uses his newfound powers to save a young woman from the clutches of an evil Frankenstein's monster-like robot, but finds that his powers vanish when the hat falls off or is removed from his head, which seems to happen often. At these times, the announcer would call to Willoughby, "Willoughby! Willoughby! The hat, Willoughby! The hat!"

The film is notable for its use of stylistic design and unusual camera angles, the influence of Screen Gem employees who had defected from Walt Disney Productions following the 1941 Disney animator's strike. The designer for Willoughby's Magic Hat, Zack Schwartz, later became one of the co-founders of United Productions of America (UPA), a company that specialized in experimental and avant-garde animated shorts.

Several later Screen Gems shorts featured the Willoughby character, something of an unusual superhero.

References

External links
 

1943 short films
American animated short films
Columbia Pictures short films
1943 animated films
American black-and-white films
Screen Gems short films
Columbia Pictures animated short films